Walram IV may refer to:

 Waleran IV, Duke of Limburg (died 1279)
 Walram IV, Count of Nassau-Idstein (1354–1393)